Zigmas is a Lithuanian masculine given name. Notable people with the name include:

Zigmas Jukna (1935–1980), Lithuanian rower who competed for the Soviet Union in the 1960 Summer Olympics
Zigmas Zinkevičius (1925–2018), leading Lithuanian linguist-historian, professor at Vilnius University
Zigmas Vaišvila (born 1956), Lithuanian politician

Lithuanian masculine given names